Topiramate, sold under the brand name Topamax among others, is a medication used to treat epilepsy and prevent migraines. It has also been used in alcohol dependence. For epilepsy this includes treatment for generalized or focal seizures. It is taken by mouth.

Common side effects include tingling, feeling tired, loss of appetite, abdominal pain, weight loss, and decreased cognitive function such as trouble concentrating. Serious side effects may include suicide, increased ammonia levels resulting in encephalopathy, and kidney stones. Use in pregnancy may result in harm to the baby and use during breastfeeding is not recommended. How it works is unclear.

Topiramate was approved for medical use in the United States in 1996. It is available as a generic medication. In 2020, it was the 57th most commonly prescribed medication in the United States, with more than 11million prescriptions.

Medical uses

Topiramate is used to treat epilepsy in children and adults, and it was originally used as an anticonvulsant. In children, it is indicated for the treatment of Lennox-Gastaut syndrome, a disorder that causes seizures and developmental delay. It is most frequently prescribed for the prevention of migraines as it decreases the frequency of attacks. Topiramate is used to treat medication overuse headache and is recommended by the European Federation of Neurological Societies as one of the few medications showing effectiveness for this indication.

Pain
A 2018 review found topiramate of no use in chronic low back pain. Topiramate has not been shown to work as a pain medicine in diabetic neuropathy, the only neuropathic condition in which it has been adequately tested.

Other
One common off-label use for topiramate is in the treatment of bipolar disorder. A review published in 2010 suggested a benefit of topiramate in the treatment of symptoms of borderline personality disorder, however the authors noted that this was based only on one randomized controlled trial and requires replication.

Topiramate has been used as a treatment for alcoholism. The U.S. Veterans Affairs and Department of Defense 2015 guidelines on substance use disorders list topiramate as a "strong for" in its recommendations for alcohol use disorder.

Other uses include treatment of obesity, binge eating disorder, and off-setting weight gain induced by taking antipsychotic medications. In 2012, the combination of phentermine/topiramate was approved in the United States for weight loss.

It is being studied as a potential treatment for post traumatic stress disorder.

There is some evidence for the use of topiramate in the management of cravings related to withdrawal from Dextromethorphan.

Adverse effects
People taking topiramate should be aware of the following risks: 
Avoid activities requiring mental alertness and coordination until drug effects are realized.
Topiramate may impair heat regulation, especially in children. Use caution with activities leading to an increased core temperature, such as strenuous exercise, exposure to extreme heat, or dehydration.
Topiramate may cause visual field defects.
Topiramate may decrease effectiveness of oestrogen-containing oral contraceptives.
Taking topiramate in the first trimester of pregnancy may increase risk of cleft lip/cleft palate in infant.
As is the case for all antiepileptic drugs, it is advisable not to suddenly discontinue topiramate as there is a theoretical risk of rebound seizures.

Frequency
Adverse effects by incidence:

Very common (>10% incidence) adverse effects include:

Common (1-10% incidence) adverse effects include:

 Weight gain
 Anaemia
 Disturbance in attention
 Memory impairment
 Amnesia
 Cognitive disorder
 Mental impairment
 Psychomotor skills impaired
 Convulsion
 Coordination abnormal
 Tremor
 Lethargy
 Hypoaesthesia (reduced sense of touch) 
 Nystagmus
 Dysgeusia
 Balance disorder
 Dysarthria
 Intention tremor
 Sedation
 Blurred vision
 Diplopia (double vision) 
 Visual disturbance
 Vertigo
 Tinnitus
 Ear pain
 Dyspnoea
 Epistaxis
 Nasal congestion
 Rhinorrhoea
 Vomiting
 Constipation
 Abdominal pain upper
 Dyspepsia
 Abdominal pain
 Dry mouth
 Stomach discomfort
 Paraesthesia oral
 Gastritis
 Abdominal discomfort
 Nephrolithiasis
 Pollakisuria
 Dysuria
 Alopecia (hair loss)
 Rash
 Pruritus
 Arthralgia
 Muscle spasms
 Myalgia
 Muscle twitching
 Muscular weakness
 Musculoskeletal chest pain
 Decreased appetite
 Pyrexia
 Asthenia
 Irritability
 Gait disturbance
 Feeling abnormal
 Malaise
 Hypersensitivity
 Bradyphrenia (slowness of thought) 
 Insomnia
 Expressive language disorder
 Anxiety
 Confusional state
 Disorientation
 Aggression
 Mood altered
 Agitation
 Mood swings
 Anger
 Abnormal behaviour

Rarely, the inhibition of carbonic anhydrase may be strong enough to cause metabolic acidosis of clinical importance.

The U.S. Food and Drug Administration (FDA) has notified prescribers that topiramate can cause acute myopia and secondary angle closure glaucoma in a small subset of people who take topiramate regularly. The symptoms, which typically begin in the first month of use, include blurred vision and eye pain. Discontinuation of topiramate may halt the progression of the ocular damage and may reverse the visual impairment.

Preliminary data suggests that, as with several other anti-epileptic drugs, topiramate carries an increased risk of congenital malformations. This might be particularly important for women who take topiramate to prevent migraine attacks. In March 2011, the FDA notified healthcare professionals and patients of an increased risk of development of cleft lip and/or cleft palate (oral clefts) in infants born to women treated with Topamax (topiramate) during pregnancy and placed it in Pregnancy Category D.

Topiramate has been associated with a statistically significant increase in suicidality, and "suicidal thoughts or actions" is now listed as one of the possible side effects of the drug "in a very small number of people, about 1 in 500."

Overdose
Symptoms of acute and acute on chronic exposure to topiramate range from asymptomatic to status epilepticus, including in patients with no seizure history. In children, overdose may also result in hallucinations. Topiramate has been deemed the primary substance that led to fatal overdoses in cases that were complicated by polydrug exposure. The most common signs of overdose are dilated pupils, somnolence, dizziness, psychomotor agitation, and abnormal, uncoordinated body movements.

Symptoms of overdose may include but are not limited to:

A specific antidote is not available. Treatment is entirely supportive.

Interactions 

Topiramate has many drug-drug interactions. Some of the most common are listed below:
 As topiramate inhibits carbonic anhydrase, use with other inhibitors of carbonic anhydrase (e.g. acetazolamide) increases the risk of kidney stones.
 Enzyme inducers (e.g. carbamazepine) can increase the elimination of topiramate, possibly necessitating dose escalations of topiramate.
 Topiramate may increase the plasma-levels of phenytoin.
 Topiramate itself is a weak inhibitor of CYP2C19 and induces CYP3A4; a decrease in plasma levels of estrogens and digoxin has been noted during topiramate therapy. This can reduce the effectiveness of oral contraceptives (birth control  pills); use of alternative birth control methods is recommended. Neither intrauterine devices (IUDs) nor Depo-Provera are affected by topiramate.
 Alcohol may cause increased sedation or drowsiness, and increase the risk of having a seizure.
 As topiramate may result in acidosis other treatments that also do so may worsen this effect.
 Oligohidrosis and hyperthermia were reported in post-marketing reports about topiramate; antimuscarinic drugs (like trospium) can aggravate these disorders.

Pharmacology
The topiramate molecule is a sulfamate modified sugar, more specifically, fructose diacetonide, an unusual chemical structure for a pharmaceutical.

Topiramate is quickly absorbed after oral use. It has a half life of 21 hours and a steady state of the drug is reached in 4 days in patients with normal renal function. Most of the drug (70%) is excreted in the urine unchanged. The remainder is extensively metabolized by hydroxylation, hydrolysis, and glucuronidation. Six metabolites have been identified in humans, none of which constitutes more than 5% of an administered dose.

Several cellular targets have been proposed to be relevant to the therapeutic activity of topiramate. These include (1) voltage-gated sodium channels; (2) high-voltage-activated calcium channels; (3) GABA-A receptors; (4) AMPA/kainate receptors; and (5) carbonic anhydrase isoenzymes. There is evidence that topiramate may alter the activity of its targets by modifying their phosphorylation state instead of by a direct action. The effect on sodium channels could be of particular relevance for seizure protection. Although topiramate does inhibit high-voltage-activated calcium channels, the relevance to clinical activity is uncertain. Effects on specific GABA-A receptor isoforms could also contribute to the antiseizure activity of the drug. Topiramate selectively inhibits cytosolic (type II) and membrane associated (type IV) forms of carbonic anhydrase. The action on carbonic anhydrase isoenzymes may contribute to the drug's side-effects, including its propensity to cause metabolic acidosis and calcium phosphate kidney stones.

Topiramate inhibits maximal seizure activity in electroconvulsive therapy and in pentylenetetrazol-induced seizures as well as partial and secondarily generalized tonic-clonic seizures in the kindling model, findings predictive of a broad spectrum of activities clinically. Its action on mitochondrial permeability transition pores has been proposed as a mechanism.

While many anticonvulsants have been associated with apoptosis in young animals, animal experiments have found that topiramate is one of the very few anticonvulsants [see: levetiracetam, carbamazepine, lamotrigine] that do not induce apoptosis in young animals at doses needed to produce an anticonvulsant effect.

Detection in body fluids
Blood, serum, or plasma topiramate concentrations may be measured using immunoassay or chromatographic methods to monitor therapy, confirm a diagnosis of poisoning in hospitalized patients, or to assist in a medicolegal death investigation. Plasma levels are usually less than 10 mg/L during therapeutic administration, but can range from 10 to 150 mg/L in overdose victims.

History
Topiramate was discovered in 1979 by Bruce E. Maryanoff and Joseph F. Gardocki during their research work at McNeil Pharmaceuticals. Topiramate was first sold
in 1996. Mylan Pharmaceuticals was granted final approval by the FDA for the sale of generic topiramate in the United States and the generic version was made available in September 2006. The last patent for topiramate in the U.S. was for use in children and expired on 28 February 2009.

References

External links 

 

American inventions
AMPA receptor antagonists
Anticonvulsants
Carbonic anhydrase inhibitors
CYP3A4 inducers
GABAA receptor positive allosteric modulators
Johnson & Johnson brands
Kainate receptor antagonists
Monosaccharide derivatives
Sodium channel blockers
Sulfamates
Wikipedia medicine articles ready to translate